Michael E. Costa (born c. 1948)  is an American football coach. He is currently the special teams coordinator and linebackers coach at Christopher Newport University.  Costa served as the head football coach at Cheyney University of Pennsylvania from 1985 to 1989 and St. Augustine's University in Raleigh, North Carolina from 2002 through the first game of the 2014 season.

Costa graduated from Flushing High School in Flushing, Queens and then played college football as a defensive back at Prairie View A&M University in Prairie View, Texas. He transferred to Norfolk State University in Norfolk, Virginia, from which he graduated in 1971. In 1981, Costa received a master's degree in health and physical education from West Chester University 1981 in West Chester, Pennsylvania.

Costa began his coaching career at Wilmington High School in Wilmington, Delaware, where was an assistant football coach from 1972 and 1981 and also coached basketball, track, and swimming. He moved to the college level in 1982 as assistant football coach at Cheyney under Andy Hinson. As assistant head coach and defensive back coach, he mentored Andre Waters, who went on to play in the National Football League (NFL). Costa succeeded Hinson as Cheyney's head football coach in 1985.

Head coaching record

Notes

References

External links
 Christopher Newport profile

Year of birth missing (living people)
1940s births
Living people
American football defensive backs
Christopher Newport Captains football coaches
Cheyney Wolves football coaches
Elizabeth City State Vikings football coaches
Hampton Pirates football coaches
Norfolk State Spartans football players
Prairie View A&M Panthers football players
St. Augustine's Falcons football coaches
Virginia Union Panthers football coaches
College track and field coaches in the United States
High school basketball coaches in Delaware
High school football coaches in Delaware
High school swimming coaches in the United States
High school track and field coaches in the United States
West Chester University alumni
People from Flushing, Queens
Sportspeople from Queens, New York
Coaches of American football from New York (state)
Players of American football from New York City
Basketball coaches from New York (state)
African-American coaches of American football
African-American players of American football
20th-century African-American sportspeople
21st-century African-American people